In graph theory, an Andrásfai graph is a triangle-free, circulant graph named after Béla Andrásfai.

Properties 
The Andrásfai graph   for any natural number  is a circulant graph on  vertices, in which vertex  is connected by an edge to vertices , for every  that is congruent to 1 mod 3. For instance, the Wagner graph is an Andrásfai graph, the graph .

From this the formula  results, where  is the Ramsey number.

References

Related Items 
 Petersen graph
 Cayley graph

Parametric families of graphs
Regular graphs